is a city located in Kagawa Prefecture, Japan. , the city had an estimated population of 108,541 in 46101 households and a population density of 970 persons per km².

Geography
Marugame is located in north-center Ehime Prefecture, on the island of Shikoku, facing the Seto Inland Sea to the north. The city covers the northeastern part of the Marugame Plain and part of the Shiwaku Islands. As with many other cities and towns in Kagawa Prefecture, there are many reservoirs. The Doki River flows from north to south through the center of the city, and to the south is Mount Tsutsumi, also known as Hatoko Fuji, one of the "Sanuki Seven Fujis".  Mount Iino, nicknamed Sanuki Fuji located on the border between Marugame and Sakaide is another of the "Sanuki Seven Fujis".

Neighbouring municipalities 
Kagawa Prefecture
Sakaide
Zentsūji
Utazu
Ayagawa
 Tadotsu
  Mannō

Climate
Marugame has a Humid subtropical climate (Köppen Cfa) characterized by warm summers and cool winters with light snowfall.  The average annual temperature in Marugame is 15.7 °C. The average annual rainfall is 1439 mm with September as the wettest month. The temperatures are highest on average in January, at around 26.6 °C, and lowest in January, at around 5.3 °C.

Demographics
Per Japanese census data, the population of Marugame has been increasing steadily since the 1970s.

History 
The area of Marugame was part of ancient Sanuki Province and has been inhabited since ancient times, with many kofun burial mounds found within the city limits. From the Heian period onwards, it was noted as an entry point for pilgrims to the Kotohira-gū shrine. During the Edo Period, the area developed as the castle town for Marugame Domain, which was ruled for 210 years by the Kyōgoku clan.  Following the Meiji restoration, the town of Marugame was established with the creation of the modern municipality system on February 15, 1890. It was elevated to city status on April 1, 1890, becoming the 53rd city in Japan.  During the 1950s  the southeast area of the city and some islands were amalgamated to form new parts of the city.

On March 22, 2005, the towns of Ayauta and Hanzan (both from Ayauta District) were merged into Marugame to create the current expanded city of Marugame.
The former Ayauta was founded in 1959 with the merger of the villages of Kumatami and Okada. Kumatama was founded by the merger of the villages of Kurikuma and Tomikuma in 1951.
The former Hanzan was founded in 1956 with the merger of the villages of Sakamoto and Hokunji.

Government
Marugame has a mayor-council form of government with a directly elected mayor and a unicameral city council of 24 members. Marugame, together with Naoshima,  contributes four members to the Ehime Prefectural Assembly. In terms of national politics, the city is divided between the Kagawa 2nd district and the Kagawa 3rd district of the lower house of the Diet of Japan.

List of mayors of Marugame (from 1899 to present)

Economy
Marugame has a mixed economy centered on agriculture (rice, vegetables, chicken, peaches) and manufacturing along a coastal belt of reclaimed land which contains a number of industrial parks, textile plants and shipyards. Traditionally, the city was noted for its production of uchiwa fans, claiming a 90% market share; however, due to mechanization and changes in fashion, only two workshops are left in the city.  Due to its well-developed transportation network, industry is expanding, and the city is increasingly becoming a commuter town for neighboring Takamatsu.

Education
Marugame has 18 public elementary schools and eight public middle schools operated by the city government, and four public high schools operated by the Ehime Prefectural Board of Education. In addition, there are one private middle school, two private high schools and two correspondence high schools. The prefecture also operates one middle school and one high school.

Transportation

Railways 
 JR Shikoku - Yosan Line
  -  
 Takamatsu-Kotohira Electric Railroad - Kotohira Line
  -

Highways 
  Takamatsu Expressway

Sister city relations
 - Donostia - San Sebastián, Spain, sionce November 6, 1990   
 - Zhangjiagang. Jiangsu, China, friendship city since May 28, 1990

Local attractions
 Marugame Castle, National Historic Site and one of only 12 Japanese castles with original wooden tenshu (keeps) remaining.
Kaitenyama Kofun, National Historic Site
Shiwaku Kinbansho, National Historic Site
 Marugame Genichiro-Inokuma Museum of Contemporary Art (MIMOCA), situated just east of the railway station, houses the works of Genichiro Inokuma, as well as playing host to many visiting exhibitions.
Reoma World, a recreational facility with many attractions, two restaurants, a spa and hotel in the theme park

Events
Marugame Half Marathon - Occurring in early February, the race attracts thousands of runners each year. Held since 1947, the Asian record in the half marathon was set on the course by Kayoko Fukushi in 2006.

Noted people from Marugame
Toshio Yamauchi, politician
Yoshihiko Isozaki, politician
Fumiko Saiga, judge on the International Criminal Court
Katsuyuki Motohiro, movie director

References

External links 

  
  

 
 

Cities in Kagawa Prefecture
 
Port settlements in Japan
Populated coastal places in Japan